Paulo Pereira da Silva, better known as Paulinho da Força (born February 24, 1956) is a Brazilian metallurgist and politician. He had served as federal deputy from 2007 to 2020, until he had his mandate repealed and political rights suspended by the Supreme Federal Court in June 2020. Pereira is a member of Solidariedade (SD).

References 

Solidariedade politicians
Living people
1956 births
People from Paraná (state)
Democratic Labour Party (Brazil) politicians
Brazilian Labour Party (current) politicians
Members of the Chamber of Deputies (Brazil) from São Paulo
Candidates for Vice President of Brazil